South Oran Berber, or Tachelhit, is a cluster of the Zenati languages, which belong to the Berber branch of the Afroasiatic family. It is spoken in a number of oases of southwestern Algeria and across the border in Morocco.

These areas include most of the ksour (fortified villages) between Mecheria and Béni Abbès: Tiout, Ain Sfisifa, Boussemghoun, Moghrar, Chellala, Asla, Fendi, Mougheul, Lahmar, Boukais, Sfissifa, Ouakda, Barrbi near Taghit, Igli, Mazzer in Algeria, Iche, Ain Chair and the seven ksour of Figuig (Ait Wadday, Ait Amar, Ait Lamiz, Ait Sliman, Ait Anaj, Ait Addi and Iznayen) in Morocco.

Of these towns, the only one whose dialect has been studied in any detail is Figuig (Kossmann 1997). A cursory study of the northern dialects, including texts and vocabulary, is Basset (1885, 1886) while a sketch grammar of its southernmost member, Igli, is provided by Kossmann (2010). El Idrissi (2017) focuses mainly on phonetic variation among the different villages.

Like many other Berber varieties, the Figuig Berber dialects use bipartite verbal negation. The preverbal negator is ul (locally un, il); the postverbal negator is ša (Igli, Mazzer) / šay (Figuig, Iche, Moghrar) / iš (Boussemghoun, Ain Chair), with both the latter two appearing as allomorphs in Tiout. The numerals 1 and 2 are Berber, while higher numerals are Arabic borrowings throughout.

References

Berber languages
Berbers in Algeria
Berbers in Morocco
Languages of Algeria
Languages of Morocco